Anneke Franziska Böhmert (born 18 February 1981) is a former field and indoor hockey player from Germany, who played as a midfielder.

Personal life
Anneke Böhmert was born and raised in Hamburg, Germany.

She works as a teacher at the Stadtteilschule Horn school.

Career

Club hockey
During her career, Böhmert represented der Club an der Alster in the Women's Bundesliga.

International hockey

Indoor
Böhmert made her debut for the Germany Indoor team in 2000, at the EuroHockey Indoor Championships in Vienna, where the team won gold.

In 2003, she was a member of the gold winning team at the Indoor World Cup in Leipzig.

Under–21
Anneke Böhmert was a member of the German U–21 from 1998 to 2001. During her period in the junior team, she won gold at the 1998 EuroHockey Junior Championships in Belfast and competed at the 2001 FIH Junior World Cup in Buenos Aires.

Die Danas
Following appearances with the Under–21 and Indoor teams, Böhmert made her debut for the senior national team in 2002.

Böhmert won her first medal at a major tournament in 2003, at the FIH Champions Challenge in Catania, taking home gold. She then went on to win bronze later that year at the EuroHockey Championships in Barcelona.

It wasn't until 2008 when Böhmert medalled again with the national team, winning silver at the FIH Champions Trophy in Mönchengladbach.

References

External links

Anneke Böhmert at the Deutscher Hockey-Bund

1981 births
Living people
German female field hockey players
Female field hockey forwards
Der Club an der Alster players
Feldhockey Bundesliga (Women's field hockey) players
Field hockey players from Hamburg